Streyella is a genus of moth in the family Gelechiidae.

Species

References

Litini
Moth genera